Dustin Brown and Jonathan Marray were the defending champions but Marray decided not to participate.
Brown played alongside Christopher Kas, but lost in the quarterfinals to Mirza Bašić and Tomislav Brkić.
Bašić and Brkić defeated Karol Beck and Igor Zelenay 6–3, 7–5 in the final to continue their run as a wildcard pair, to win the title.

Seeds

Draw

Draw

References
 Main Draw

BH Telecom Indoors - Doubles
2013 Doubles